Shin Hla Myat was duchess of Pakhan from 1429 to 1450/51. The eldest daughter of King Mohnyin Thado may also have served as the (acting) governor of Pakhan and the surrounding ten regions after her husband Thihapate was transferred to Mohnyin in 1439. Hla Myat was the mother of Queen Ameitta Thiri Maha Dhamma Dewi of Ava.

Brief
Hla Myat was the third child of Thado and Myat Hla. She was born and grew up in Mohnyin, where her father was sawbwa (lord governor) of the region. In 1426, her father was successful in seizing the Ava throne. On the day of the coronation, Hla Myat was married off to Thihapate.

She and her husband were first cousins (if not double first cousins). The couple had had two sons and six daughters.

The duchess was still alive in 1466/67 when she sponsored merit-making donations to the public under five pyatthats west of Ava (Inwa).

Ancestry
Shin Hla Myat was descended from a distant branch of the Pinya and Pagan royal lines from her paternal side, and from the maternal line, a two times great grandchild of King Thihathu of Pinya.

Notes

References

Bibliography
 
 
 

Ava dynasty
15th-century Burmese women